Dayoutoftheoffice (foaled  February 19, 2018 ) is an American Thoroughbred racehorse and the winner of the 2020 Frizette Stakes.

Career

Dayoutoftheoffice's first race was on May 14, 2020 at Gulfstream Park, where she came in first. 

On July 16, 2020, she won the Grade-3 Schuylerville Stakes. She defeated Make Mischief by 6th lengths at 19:1 odds.

On October 10, 2020, she won her 3rd race in a row when she won the Grade-1 Frizette Stakes. She defeated the 4:5 favorite Vequist by 2 lengths at 2:1 odds. 

On November 6, 2020, she competed in the Grade-1 Breeders' Cup Juvenile Fillies. While she had beaten Vequist in the prior race, Vequist defeated her by 2 lengths. This time, she was victorious over Dayoutoftheoffice by 2 lengths after coming in as the 4th ranked favorite for the race.

Pedigree

References

2018 racehorse births